En Thangai may refer to:

 En Thangai (1952 film), a 1952 Tamil-language film starring M. G. Ramachandran
 En Thangai (1989 film), a 1989 Tamil-language Indian feature film
 En Thangai Kalyani, a 1990 Tamil-language Indian feature film
 En Thangai (TV series), 2015 TV show